Wedington Woods is an unincorporated community in Litteral Township, Washington County, Arkansas, United States. It is located west of Fayetteville, north of Wedington Drive. A small grass airport exists named Wedington Woods Airport.

References

Unincorporated communities in Washington County, Arkansas
Unincorporated communities in Arkansas